The Colorado Formation is a Late Cretaceous (Campanian to Maastrichtian geologic formation that is exposed within the Colorado Basin in the southeastern part of La Pampa Province, Argentina. Fossil dinosaur eggs of Sphaerovum erbeni have been reported from the nonmarine, fluvial strata of this formation.

Description 
The Colorado Formation comprises medium-grained sandstones with intercalated conglomerates with pebbly beds that can be interpreted as fluvial to alluvial deposits.

See also 
 List of dinosaur-bearing rock formations
 List of stratigraphic units with dinosaur trace fossils#Eggs or nests

References

Bibliography 
 

Geologic formations of Argentina
Upper Cretaceous Series of South America
Cretaceous Argentina
Campanian Stage
Maastrichtian Stage of South America
Sandstone formations
Conglomerate formations
Alluvial deposits
Fluvial deposits
Ooliferous formations
Fossiliferous stratigraphic units of South America
Paleontology in Argentina
Geology of La Pampa Province